This is a list of fossiliferous stratigraphic units in Hungary.

List of fossiliferous stratigraphic units in Hungary

See also 
 Lists of fossiliferous stratigraphic units in Europe
 List of fossiliferous stratigraphic units in Slovakia
 List of fossiliferous stratigraphic units in Ukraine
 List of fossiliferous stratigraphic units in Romania
 List of fossiliferous stratigraphic units in Serbia
 List of fossiliferous stratigraphic units in Croatia
 List of fossiliferous stratigraphic units in Slovenia
 List of fossiliferous stratigraphic units in Austria

References 

 

 
 Hungary
 
Hungary geography-related lists